Kaiser Wilhelm der Grosse may refer to:

 , an ocean liner
 , a battleship

German Navy ship names